Raymond J. Ciccarelli (born January 20, 1970) is an American professional stock car racing driver. He last competed part-time in the NASCAR Camping World Truck Series, driving the No. 49 Chevrolet Silverado for his own team, CMI Motorsports. He has also competed in what are now the ARCA Menards Series and ARCA Menards Series East in the past.

Racing career

ARCA Racing Series
Ciccarelli drove part-time in the series in 2014, 2015, and 2016 for teams Carter 2 Motorsports, Kimmel Racing, Hamilton-Hughes Racing, and Hixson Motorsports. He started his own team, Ciccarelli Racing, for 2017. The team's first race came in the season-opener at Daytona where Ciccarelli finished 21st in his No. 38 Ford after a solid seventh-place qualifying run. The team returned at Talladega, although they used owner points from the full-time Hixson Motorsports No. 3 car to have a better shot of qualifying for the race (which they successfully did). Using that number instead of the No. 38 (which had only run Daytona), they picked up a thirteenth-place finish in the race. Ciccarelli had driven for the Hixson team in a few races in 2016.

Truck Series

In 2017, Ciccarelli made his Truck Series debut in the Eldora Dirt Derby, driving the No. 10 truck for Jennifer Jo Cobb Racing. He started 32nd and finished 22nd. After that, he start-and-parked the No. 0 truck for the same team in 4 races at Michigan, New Hampshire, Texas, and Phoenix. He finished 26th, 29th, 28th, and 26th respectively. He returned to the No. 10 truck at Homestead. He qualified 31st, but an engine malfunction before the green flag waved gave him a 32nd-place finish.

In 2019, Ciccarelli acquired trucks, equipment, and owner points from the closed Premium Motorsports No. 49 truck and restarted his own team, now under the name CMI Motorsports, which stood for "Ciccarelli Moving & Installation", a company owned by Ciccarelli and which is one of the team's sponsors. After running the first two races of the season, Ciccarelli and the CMI Motorsports team skipped the third round at Las Vegas with a planned comeback for the fourth round at Martinsville.

Planned departure from NASCAR announcement
Ciccarelli announced in June 2020 his retirement from NASCAR as a driver and a team owner at the end of the 2020 season. His announcement, which came in the form of a post on his Facebook page on June 10, was made on the same day as NASCAR's decision to ban the display of the Confederate flag from their events, a decision they made in the midst of the George Floyd protests due to the flag's longtime association with white supremacist groups. While many NASCAR drivers praised the ban, Ciccarelli decried it, as he believed that it and other recent decisions by the sanctioning body ventured into the realm of politics.

However, Ciccarelli's team, CMI Motorsports, would post on their Twitter account on October 30 that "We're not done yet. See you all in 2021.", which indicated that he would not close down his team after the 2020 season as planned. On November 19, when it was revealed on TobyChristie.com that Tim Viens would continue as a driver for CMI, Ciccarelli told the website that he planned on driving in three to four races in 2021, and therefore cancelling his plans to retire as a driver.

Motorsports career results

NASCAR
(key) (Bold – Pole position awarded by qualifying time. Italics – Pole position earned by points standings or practice time. * – Most laps led.)

Camping World Truck Series

Busch East Series

ARCA Racing Series

References

External links

 

Living people
1970 births
ARCA Menards Series drivers
NASCAR drivers
People from Ellicott City, Maryland
Racing drivers from Baltimore
Racing drivers from Maryland